Nomi Prins is an American economist,author, journalist, and public speaker who writes about Wall Street and the US economy.

Before becoming a journalist and public speaker, Prins had a very successful career in finance, reaching the upper echelons of Wall Street. She worked as a managing director at Goldman Sachs, senior managing director at Bear Stearns in London, senior strategist at Lehman Brothers and analyst at the Chase Manhattan Bank. Prins was also a Distinguished Senior Fellow at Demos think tank from 2002 to 2016.

Prins is known for her book All the Presidents' Bankers: The Hidden Alliances that Drive American Power. Based on original archival documents, the book explores over a century of close relationships between the 19 presidents from Teddy Roosevelt to Barack Obama and the key bankers of their day, and analyzes how they shaped US domestic and foreign policy. Prins also received recognition for her whistleblower book, It Takes a Pillage: Behind the Bonuses, Bailouts, and Backroom Deals from Washington to Wall Street; for her views on the U.S. economy; for her published spending figures on federal programs and initiatives related to the 2008 bailout; and for her advocacy for the reinstatement of the Glass–Steagall Act and other regulatory reform of the financial industry. She was a member of Senator Bernie Sanders' panel of expert economists formed to advise on reforming the Federal Reserve.

Personal
Nomi Prins was born in upstate New York, the oldest child in her family. Her father Jack worked for IBM after having taught at the local college as a mathematics professor. Jack Prins received a masters degree from Rutgers University and a PHD from NYU in statistics.

Education
Prins received her bachelor's degree in mathematics from State University of New York at Purchase with a minor in music and a Master in Science in statistics from New York University. She received her PhD in International Strategic Studies with a specialization in International Political Economy from the Federal University of Rio Grande do Sul in Porto Alegre, Brazil.

Career in finance
After graduating, Prins started at Chase Manhattan bank as an analyst, after which she worked as a senior strategist for Lehman Brothers. In 1993 she moved to Bear Stearns in London, where she led the international analytics group as a senior managing director. Finally, she worked for two years as a managing director at Goldman Sachs, until she quit Wall Street. Prins was then a Distinguished Senior Fellow at the US think tank Demos from 2002 to 2016.

Prins has been a speaker on how to get banks to better serve the real economy at the Federal Reserve, International Monetary Fund and World Bank Annual conference. She has also offered public testimony to the U.S Senate speaking on the growing influence of private equity firms and Wall Street greed.

Career as an author
Regarding her book It Takes a Pillage, author Jim Hightower said, "Nomi Prins knows the mind-set, knows how to read spreadsheets, knows the people, and knows Wall Street's games. Nomi knows and now Nomi tells."

Regarding All the Presidents' Bankers:
 "A calm, authoritative elucidation of verifiable history" – Financial Times
"Even those who have read Secrets of the Temple, William Greider's massive and brilliant 1987 exposé of the Federal Reserve, will find Prins's book worth their time. She presents a new narrative, one that shows how the changing cast of six has shaped America's fortunes under presidents in both parties." – American Prospect
"Prins divides her justifiably long text into digestible one- to three-page segments and seamlessly incorporates dozens of prominent banker profiles. Her work is highly recommended both to general readers and to students of financial history." – Library Journal
"A revealing look at the often symbiotic, sometimes-adversarial relationship between the White House and Wall Street... [A] sweeping history of bank presidents and their relationships with the nation's chief executives" — Kirkus Reviews

Works
Prins's articles have appeared in The New York Times, Fortune, Newsday, Mother Jones, Slate.com, The Guardian, The Nation, The American Prospect, Alternet, New York Daily News, La Vanguardia, and other publications. She is a monthly contributor to Tom Dispatch where she offers analysis on the connections between Wall Street and Washington. Her latest book, Permanent Distortion was released in October 2022. Permanent Distortion details how the movement of money by central banks has influenced global markets and economic policies and furthered the separation between Wall Street and the real economy. The Nation Books imprint Bold Type Books published her book Collusion.

Books
Permanent Distortion: How the Financial Markets Abandoned the Real Economy Forever – Publisher: Public Affairs (10/11/22): .
Collusion: How Central Bankers Rigged the World - Publisher: Nation Books (5/1/18): . The author claims that central bankers control global markets and dictate economic policy.
All the Presidents' Bankers: The Hidden Alliances that Drive American Power – Publisher: Nation Books (4/8/14): .
It Takes a Pillage: Behind the Bonuses, Bailouts, and Backroom Deals from Washington to Wall Street – Publisher: John Wiley & Sons (9/22/09); ; .
Other People's Money: The Corporate Mugging of America – Publisher: New Press (8/1/06); ; . An account of corporate corruption, political collusion and Wall Street deception. This book was chosen as a Best Book of 2004 by The Economist, Barron's and The Library Journal.
Jacked: How "Conservatives" are Picking your Pocket (whether you voted for them or not) – Publisher: Polipoint Press (9/1/06); ; . Catalogs her travels around the USA talking to people about their economic lives.
Black Tuesday – Publisher: CreateSpace 2011 – . A historical novel about the Crash of 1929.

References

External links

 
 

Year of birth missing (living people)
Living people
American financial analysts
American financial writers
American financial commentators
American alternative journalists
American whistleblowers
Journalists from New York City
New York University Stern School of Business alumni
State University of New York at Purchase alumni
Women financial analysts
21st-century American journalists
21st-century American non-fiction writers
21st-century American women writers
American women non-fiction writers
Writers from Poughkeepsie, New York